Robert McKenzie Wallace (1908–1991) was a Scottish footballer who played mainly as a right back and spent most of his career with Hamilton Academical. He took part in the 1935 Scottish Cup Final which Accies lost 2–1 to Rangers. He continued to play for Hamilton in unofficial competitions following the outbreak of World War II before moving on to Dumbarton in 1943. He remained at Boghead Park until 1947, registering a season of appearances in the normal competitions after the conflict was over.

References

1908 births
1991 deaths
People from Polmont
Footballers from Falkirk (council area)
Scottish footballers
Association football defenders
Blantyre Victoria F.C. players
Hamilton Academical F.C. players
Dumbarton F.C. players
Scottish Junior Football Association players
Scottish Football League players
Date of birth unknown
Date of death unknown